Herbert Zimmermann (29 November 1917 – 16 December 1966) was a popular German football commentator.

He did one of the most famous pieces of commentary in German during the World Cup final in 1954 by "recommending" the goal that won "The Miracle of Bern" for West Germany.

Schäfer nach innen geflankt... Kopfball... Abgewehrt. Aus dem Hintergrund müßte Rahn schießen... Rahn schießt! Tor! Tor! Tor! Tor!(silence)Tor für Deutschland! Drei zu zwei führt Deutschland. Halten Sie mich für verrückt, halten Sie mich für übergeschnappt!

Schäfer puts in the cross... header... Cleared. Rahn should shoot from deep... Rahn shoots! Goal! Goal! Goal! Goal!(Zimmermann fell silent for eight seconds before he spoke again)Goal for Germany! Germany lead 3-2. Call me mad, call me crazy!"

At the end of the match, Zimmermann famously proclaimed, "It's over! Over! Over! Germany are the World Champions" - words which, as one historian has observed, are "as famous in Germany as Kenneth Wolstenholme's "They think it's all over" is in England" (the latter having been spoken in the final moments of England's victory against West Germany in the World Cup final of 1966). After the final Zimermann was criticized for praising the goal keeper Turek by calling him Toni du bist ein Teufelskerl, Toni du bist ein Fußballgott (Toni you are a devil chap. Toni you are a football god.). Zimmermann who had been a major during the war, was also criticized for the somewhat militaristic vocabulary he had used during the match.
 
Zimmermann also commented the world championships in 1958, 1962 and 1966 over the radio. However, TV was more prominent now as most people had access to TV sets, so fewer and fewer people heard his reports.

On 11 December 1966 Zimmermann, who was known as a notoriously bad driver, had an accident in his car and died from his injuries five days later.

Zimmermann was the uncle of the German Green Party politician Hans-Christian Ströbele. The family holds the rights to his reports which still generates revenue.

Awards 
 Wound Badge in Silver (1942)
 Iron Cross 2nd and 1st Class
 Knight's Cross of the Iron Cross on 5 April 1945 as Hauptmann and chief of the 1/Panzer-Regiment 36

Notes

References

Citations

Bibliography

Further reading 
(DE) Werner Raupp: Toni Turek – "Fußballgott". Eine Biographie, Hildesheim: Arete 2019, p.107–112, 124–128.

External links
 
 audio excerpts of Zimmermann's radio commentary from 4 July 1954 (German Historical Museum)

1917 births
1966 deaths
German radio personalities
German sports journalists
German male journalists
People from the Rhine Province
Recipients of the Knight's Cross of the Iron Cross
Road incident deaths in Germany
German Army officers of World War II
Military personnel from North Rhine-Westphalia
People from Aachen (district)